Liu Haiying (born 3 April 1964) is a Chinese sport shooter who competed in the 1984 Summer Olympics and in the 1988 Summer Olympics.

References

1964 births
Living people
Chinese female sport shooters
ISSF pistol shooters
Olympic shooters of China
Shooters at the 1984 Summer Olympics
Shooters at the 1988 Summer Olympics
Shooters at the 1990 Asian Games
Asian Games medalists in shooting
Asian Games gold medalists for China
Medalists at the 1990 Asian Games